Lisbet Holtedahl (née Therkelsen; born 26 June 1946) is a Danish-born Norwegian social anthropologist and film producer.

Biography
Holtedahl was born in Copenhagen to dentist Stig Oscar Therkelsen and Lizzie Jacobsen. In 1967 she married professor of medicine, Knut Arne Holtedahl. She graduated as cand.mag. from the University of Tromsø in 1973, and as dr. philos. in 1987. She also received film education at the Ateliers Varan in Paris. Her research objects have been villages in Northern Norway and societies in Cameroon, often with focus on women's role in the society. She has produced several anthropological films, as an aid both for research and documentation. In 1996, she was awarded the Research Council of Norway's Award for Excellence in Communication of Science.

References

1946 births
Living people
People from Copenhagen
Danish emigrants to Norway
Norwegian anthropologists
Social anthropologists
Norwegian women anthropologists
Women's studies academics
University of Tromsø alumni
Academic staff of the University of Tromsø